Psilocybe oaxacana is a species of psychedelic mushroom in the family Hymenogastraceae native to Oaxaca, Mexico.  It is in the Psilocybe fagicola complex with Psilocybe fagicola, Psilocybe banderillensis, Psilocybe columbiana, Psilocybe herrerae, Psilocybe keralensis, Psilocybe neoxalapensis, and Psilocybe teofiloi.

See also
List of Psilocybe species
List of Psilocybin mushrooms
Psilocybe

References

External links

The taxonomy of Psilocybe fagicola-complex

Entheogens
Psychoactive fungi
oaxacana
Psychedelic tryptamine carriers
Fungi described in 2004
Fungi of North America
Taxa named by Gastón Guzmán